According to the British government, the United Kingdom of Great Britain and Northern Ireland and the Kingdom of Saudi Arabia have long been close allies. Relations between the two countries date back to 1848, when Faisal bin Turki, ruler of the Second Saudi state, formally requested the support of the British Political Resident in Bushire for his representative in Trucial Oman.

During First World War, Ibn Saud signed the 1915 Treaty of Darin with the British government, thereby accepting the status of a British protectorate. On 20 May 1927, the British government and the Kingdom of Nejd concluded the Treaty of Jeddah, a further agreement. The United Kingdom was among the first states that recognised the country in 1926 and had a diplomatic delegation in the country. Saudi Arabia opened its embassy in London in 1930, which was the country's second official foreign affairs body abroad and led by Hafiz Wahba.

Saudi Arabia and the United Kingdom are strategic allies. There are more than 200 joint ventures between British and Saudi Companies, worth $17.5 billion, and some 30,000 British nationals are living and working in Saudi Arabia as well as nearly 100,000 Saudi nationals living in the UK. Saudi Arabia is the United Kingdom's primary trading partner in the Middle East and the United Kingdom is Saudi Arabia's closest European ally.

The UK has an embassy in Riyadh, consulate in Jeddah and trade office in Al Khobar.  The current British ambassador to Saudi Arabia is Neil Crompton. Saudi Arabia has an embassy and consulate in London. Mohammed bin Nawwaf bin Abdulaziz was the Saudi ambassador to the UK between 2005 and 2019. He was replaced by Khalid bin Bandar Al Saud both of whom are the members of the House of Saud.

In May 2021, the foreign ministries of Saudi Arabia and the UK met in London and discussed global issues and bilateral relations, as well as the issue of Palestine.

Al-Yamamah arms deal controversy 
In 1985, British Prime Minister Margaret Thatcher and Bandar bin Sultan Al Saud, son of the Saudi defence minister, negotiated the Al-Yamamah arms deal for British-based arms company British Aerospace (now privatised and known as BAE Systems). Since then, the deal has brought in £43 billion in revenue for BAE Systems.

According to police estimates, more than £6 billion may have been paid to Saudi officials in order for BAE Systems to gain this contract. According to 'US sources', cited by the Guardian newspaper, millions of pounds went to Prince Bandar himself, distributed in chunks of up to $30 million (£15 million) at a time. Asked about allegations of royal corruption in 2001, Prince Bandar said: "If you tell me that building this whole country [...] out of $400bn, that we misused, or got, $50bn, I'll tell you, 'Yes. So what?'"

According to the Guardian, around £60 million was allegedly spent by BAE Systems on extravagant holidays, fleets of classic cars, shopping trips and escorts for Prince Turki bin Nasser Al Saud, who controlled the Royal Saudi Air Force. The newspaper also alleged that Bandar's father and Turki bin Nasser's father-in-law Prince Sultan bin Abdulaziz Al Saud was described by a British ambassador as having "a corrupt interest in all contracts" while the Guardian's legal sources alleged that BAE disguised many of the payments by making them through an anonymous offshore company called Poseidon.

With reference to this scandal, former British defence secretary Ian Gilmour, Baron Gilmour of Craigmillar told the BBC: "If you are paying bribes to high-up people in the government, the fact that it's illegal in Saudi law doesn't mean much."

Senior British figures were aware of the allegations. Within days of the deal being announced, Margaret Thatcher's chief adviser Charles Powell, Baron Powell of Bayswater, who went on to work for BAE Systems, received an Arab-language magazine which detailed accusations of Bandar and others taking huge commissions. The British government advised the Ministry of Defence not to comment on the allegations.

Decades later, after these allegations were repeated in the Guardian newspaper in 2004, BAE Systems admitted it was being investigated by Britain's Serious Fraud Office. Several senior BAE Systems employees were interviewed or arrested.

In 2005, the United Kingdom and Saudi Arabia agreed a military agreement, where BAE Systems would equip Saudi Arabia with Eurofighter Typhoons. In 2006, the Saudis threatened to end co-operation with the UK unless the Serious Fraud Office dropped its investigation into BAE Systems over the Al-Yamamah arms deal. On 8 December 2006, Tony Blair (who was the British Prime Minister at the time), wrote a secret personal letter to the Attorney General, Lord Goldsmith, in which he urged Goldsmith to stop the Serious Fraud Office investigation. In the letter, Blair stated he was worried about the "critical difficulty" the investigation could cause for the negotiations of the new Eurofighter Typhoon sales contracts. Shortly after, the investigation was shelved on 'national security' grounds. This decision was later found to have not been legal by the High Court. Two senior judges condemned what they called the government's "abject" surrender to a "blatant" threat by the Saudis.

While BAE Systems never admitted to corruption or bribery, they did pay fines of £286 million in order to settle British and American probes into corruption at the company. No further action was taken against the company and nobody working for the British or Saudi governments or BAE Systems ever served prison time as a result of the allegations.

British reaction to Saudi-led Intervention in Yemen  

In March 2015, after Houthi rebels took control of Yemen and ousted former president  Abdrabbuh Mansur Hadi, a coalition of Gulf states led by Saudi Arabia began to bomb and impose a naval blockade on Yemen. The coalition was led by the Saudi Arabian Air, Ground and Naval forces, who confirmed the use of 100 fighter jets, 150.000 ground forces and some naval units. Saudi Arabia was assisted by the armies of the United Arab Emirates, Bahrain, Kuwait, Sudan and Egypt who have each committed between 3 and 30 fighter jets, as well as Jordan and Morocco, who confirmed their support, but the details of which remain unspecified. Between the start of the attack and December 2016, Britain licensed £3.3 billion worth of arms to Saudi Arabia despite protests from the public, politicians, media outlets and campaign groups. This included £2.2 billion worth of ML10 licenses (aircraft, helicopters and drones), £1.1 billion worth of ML4 licenses (grenades, bombs, missiles, countermeasures) and £430,000 of ML6 licenses (armoured vehicles and tanks).

The UK’s biggest arms company BAE Systems sold over £17 billion worth of equipment and services to the Saudi Arabian military since 2015.

In June 2016, Campaign Against Arms Trade gained permission from the British High Court to bring a judicial review against the government over British arms sales to Saudi Arabia. In response to this decision, Campaign Against Arms Trade spokesman Andrew Smith said: "This is a historic decision and we welcome the fact that arms exports to Saudi Arabia will be given the full scrutiny of a legal review, but they should never have been allowed in the first place. The fact that UK aircraft and bombs are being used against Yemen is a terrible sign of how broken the arms export control system is. For too long, government has focused on maximising and promoting arms sales, rather than on the human rights of those they are used against". After hearing closed evidence kept concealed "on grounds of national security", Lord Justice Burnett and Mr Justice Haddon-Cave found that the secretary of state's decision to sustain the UK's arms trade with Saudi Arabia was "not unlawful". CAAT vowed to appeal the decision.

In November 2016, two parliamentary committees (Committee on Arms Export Controls and International Development and Business Committee) released a joint report calling for the British government to stop licensing arms exports to Saudi Arabia until a UN investigation had been conducted into alleged breaches of international humanitarian law. However, British government ministers Liam Fox, Boris Johnson, Michael Fallon and Priti Patel released a statement saying they disagreed with the parliamentary committee's recommendations.

In December 2016, British  government research revealed that British-made cluster bombs had been used by the Saudi-led coalition in Yemen. This was confirmed by the Saudi Arabian government in the same month. Cluster munitions (another term for cluster bombs) can lie unexploded for long periods of time and cause severe injury to civilians even years after the initial attack. It is illegal to use, produce, transfer or stockpile cluster bombs, since the coming into force of the UN Convention on Cluster Munition on 1 August 2010. This treaty is international law and although Saudi Arabia has neither signed nor ratified it, the UK ratified this treaty in 2010, meaning it is not only illegal for the UK to produce and transfer cluster bombs according to British as well as international law, but the country also has a duty to promote the aims and ratification of the treaty to non-signatory states.

In January 2017, Parliament debated a motion calling for an independent investigation into violations of International Humanitarian Law in Yemen. Incidents to be investigated include the bombing of a funeral which killed 140 people; the bombing of a refugee camp and eight bombings of densely populated areas in Sa'dah, Sana'a, Hodeidah, Hajjah and Ibb, which Amnesty International have raised concerns about.

In a 20 June 2019 judgment, the Court of Appeal ruled favouring the anti-arms trade campaigners in their legal campaign against the government over their arms sales to the Saudi government. The Campaign Against Arms Trade (CAAT) asserted that the arms sales made by the British government are being used by the Saudi-led coalition in their violations of international law. International trade secretary, Liam Fox, said that the government would challenge the judgment, but had adjourned any licences for the Saudi government and its partners in the coalition.

At the June 2019 G20 Summit held in Osaka, Japan, UK Prime Minister Theresa May urged the Crown Prince of the Kingdom of Saudi Arabia to collaborate with the United Nations to find a solution to the 4-year long conflict in Yemen.

Labour Party leader, Jeremy Corbyn, claimed that the Prime Minister was not successful in signalling the UK government's disapproval of Saudi's role in Yemen war. He added, "She should confirm the UK government will immediately stop selling arms to his regime."

Andrew Smith, of Campaign Against Arms Trade (CAAT), said that Jeremy Hunt and Boris Johnson "have played an utterly central and complicit role in arming and supporting the Saudi-led destruction of Yemen." Jeremy Hunt's Conservative leadership campaign was partly funded by Ken Costa, investment banker with close ties to Saudi Arabia's Crown Prince.

In 2019 a Channel 4 documentary film named: "Britain's Hidden War: Channel 4 Dispatches", a former BAE Systems worker revealed that the Royal Saudi Air Force (RSAF) would be unable to fly its fleet of Typhoon fighter jets without BAE's support; the former BAE worker explained: “With the amount of aircraft they’ve got and the operational demands, if we weren’t there in 7 to 14 days there wouldn’t be a jet in the sky.” According to the report of UN experts and the world’s most valued NGOs documenting a consistent pattern of violations, the UK is responsible for international law violations as the leading arms provider of the Saudi Arabia-led.

On 7 July 2020, Liz Truss, former international trade secretary, announced that UK would resume the arms export to Saudi Arabia. The United Kingdom arms trade and military equipment sale to Saudi Arabia was blocked under court ruling in 2019 due to possible use of arms in the violation of international humanitarian law particularly in Yemen.

In October 2020, CAAT launched a judicial challenge against the UK government over the renewal of arms sale to Saudi Arabia, upon the usage of arms and weapons in Yemen conflict that brought the worst humanitarian crisis.

Fallout from Saudi crucifixion sentence for pro-democracy protester 
On 14 February 2012, a Saudi 70-year old called Ali Mohammed Baqir al-Nimr was arrested after taking part in anti-government rallies in Saudi Arabia. In 2014, he was sentenced to death and pro-Saudi government media reported that Nimr would be crucified.

In September 2015, Jeremy Corbyn, Britain's opposition leader, used his speech to Labour Party conference to call on Britain's Ministry of Justice to drop its bid for a £5.9 million Saudi prisons contract, partly because of Al-Nimr's imminent execution. The bid had been put in by Justice Solutions International, the commercial arms of the Ministry of Justice.

There was also controversy, among the British press and public, when the Saudis sentenced British pensioner Karl Andree to 350 lashes after he was arrested for transporting home-made wine in his car.

Saudi Arabia's ambassador to Britain, Prince Mohammed bin Nawaf bin Abdulaziz, wrote a response to Jeremy Corbyn's speech in Britain's Telegraph newspaper. In it, he accused Corbyn of disrespect and referred to the arrests and crucifixion sentences of pro-democracy activists and threats of lashing against a pensioner transporting wine in his car as "a number of domestic events in the Kingdom". "We will not be lectured to by anyone," he said.

Despite pressure from the Saudi governments and top figures in the British government like David Cameron and Philip Hammond, the justice secretary Michael Gove cancelled the contract in October 2015. However, the government did continue resisted pressure from human rights groups to stop licensing weapons exports to Saudi Arabia. Between October 2015 and September 2016, the British government licensed at least £544 million worth of military exports to Saudi Arabia including components for bombs, machine guns and sniper rifles.

According to the Telegraph, the UK's Foreign Office feared that Mohammed bin Nawaf was poised to react to the prisons contract cancellation by taking a temporary "leave of absence" while a wide-ranging review of relations with the UK was conducted. In order to repair the damage from these events, and to ensure the Saudis keep buying weapons from British-headquartered companies like BAE Systems, Foreign Secretary Philip Hammond travelled to Saudi Arabia on 27 October 2015. While there, he met with Saudi King Salman; interior minister and crown prince Mohammed Bin Naif; defence minister and deputy crown prince Mohammed bin Salman and the leader of Saudi Arabia's National Guard Prince Mutaib. Travelling with Hammond were Hugh Blackman, the commander of the British Military Mission to Saudi Arabia; Peter Drew, the programme director of the joint British and Saudi military programme 'Saudi-Arabia National Guard Communication project' and two British military attaches.

In the same month, the Prime Minister's chief of staff Edward Llewellyn, Baron Llewellyn of Steep visited Saudi King Salman in Riyadh in what the Telegraph called "a secret diplomatic offensive with Saudi Arabia after row".

Military cooperation 

The UK's Ministry of Defence Saudi Armed Forces Project (MODSAP) supplies weapons and services to the Saudi Armed Forces under the Saudi British Defence Cooperation Programme (SBDCP) and the SALAM Project. MODSAP's principal roles are to monitor the progress and performance of the SBDCP and the Salam prime contractor, UK-headquartered arms company BAE Systems, so that the requirements of Saudi Arabia's armed forces are faithfully met. 

The UK's Ministry of Defence also runs the Saudi Arabia National Guard Communications Project, which aims to improve the communication capabilities of Saudi Arabia's National Guard. The UK also runs a British Military Mission to the Saudi Arabian National Guard.

In 2021, the UK stated that it would not stop selling weapons to Saudi Arabia. In March 2022, Boris Johnson visited Saudi Arabia as "part of efforts to secure more oil supplies".

British parliamentary committee report on relations 

In 2013, a UK parliamentary committee report was published, examining the UK's relationship with Saudi Arabia. The Saudi ambassador to the UK warned of negative consequences for bilateral relations when the parliamentary enquiry was announced in 2012.

MPs on the foreign affairs committee also asked the government to "assess" the supply of weapons by Saudi Arabia to Syrian rebels seeking to overthrow President Bashar al-Assad. However, the report found no "conclusive proof" that it has been used for internal repression, and said there would be "significant costs for the UK-Saudi relationship" by ending sales. MPs described Saudi Arabia as "part of the problem as well as part of the solution" in counter-terrorism co-operation. The government was urged to try to "improve the monitoring of the funding flowing from Saudi Arabia to organisations with an extremist message", and to ensure that its "legitimate promotion of religious values does not inadvertently contribute to the furtherance of extremism." It was also asked to give an "assessment of the situation and the actions it is taking to monitor Syrian rebel groups that are receiving funding and arms from Saudi Arabia, and its efforts to engage with the Saudi authorities regarding any concerns about them."

The foreign affairs committee report noted: "Democratic governments such as the UK face a challenge in trying to reconcile their liberal constituencies at home with the need to maintain relationships with undemocratic and conservative regimes that are important to their interests on a regional and global level." Another section asserted:

Richard Ottaway, the foreign affairs committee chairman, said:

A spokesperson for The Campaign Against the Arms Trade (CAAT) stated that "Unfortunately it looks as though arms company and establishment interests reached into the heart of this inquiry. The foreign affairs committee is giving cover to the UK government as it continues the policy of pandering to despicable regimes in its desire to drum up sales for [defence firm] BAE Systems." Ann Feltham from CAAT added that:

Al Salam arms deal 

After two years of lobbying from the government and BAE Systems, in February 2014, British arms company BAE Systems agreed a deal to supply the Saudis with 72 Typhoon fighter jets, worth £4.4 billion (just over US$7 billion). This followed sustained pressure from the British government which involved, among numerous other things, British Crown Prince Charles performing a sword dance dressed in traditional Saudi ceremonial dress.

Death of King Abdullah 

In January 2015, Prince Charles travelled to the Saudi capital Riyadh, as did a number of world leaders including Prime Minister David Cameron, to pay his respects following the death of the nation's King Abdullah. The decision following the King's death to fly flags at half-mast on key public buildings in London drew sharp criticism from some prominent politicians who highlighted claims of Saudi Arabia's abuses of free speech, women's rights and the country's role as a cradle of Islamist extremism.

Human rights abuses 

In February 2015, Prince Charles visited Saudi Arabia, at the request of the British Government because of his close ties to the Saudi royal family, and he was accompanied by senior Foreign Office officials. According to a Telegraph source, Charles raised the case of Raif Badawi, a pro-democracy blogger who had been flogged in public a month before. The Telegraph source said the Prince received a "friendly response" from Saudi royals. Badawi remained in prison and his supporters fear he could be publicly flogged again at any time.

In October 2018, Saudi journalist Jamal Khashoggi, a columnist for The Washington Post, went missing from the Saudi consulate in Istanbul. The Turkish authorities accused the Saudi government of murdering and dismembering the 59-year old journalist. Khashoggi was a critic of crown prince Mohammad bin Salman and was living in exile in the United States from the past one year. Saudi denied the allegations. Amidst the controversy, Jeremy Hunt asked Saudi Arabia to urgently explain the disappearance of Khashoggi. In a phone call to Adel al-Jubeir, Hunt warned that "friendships depend on shared values".

After Saudi Arabia accepted to have killed Khashoggi inside the Saudi consulate in Turkey, Theresa May vowed to not let any suspect involved in the murder enter the UK in future. She said if any suspect had a British visa, it would be revoked.

On 12 November 2018, the UK Foreign Secretary, Jeremy Hunt flew to Saudi Arabia to request Mohammad bin Salman's cooperation with the Turkish authorities into the murder of Jamal Khashoggi. Hunt said, "It is clearly unacceptable that the full circumstances behind his murder still remain unclear. We encourage the Saudi authorities to cooperate fully with the Turkish investigation into his death, so that we deliver justice for his family and the watching world. The international community remains united in horror and outrage at the brutal murder of Jamal Khashoggi one month ago."

The Prime Minister of the United Kingdom, Theresa May, during her 20-minute meeting with the crown prince of Saudi Arabia, Mohammed bin Salman, at the 2019 G20 Summit addressed the need for maintaining transparency in the Jamal Khashoggi murder legal process.

On 6 June 2020, sixteen Members of Parliament from different parties and peers wrote a letter to the UK government urging them to actively look into the sportswashing attempts made by Saudi Arabia through the takeover of Newcastle United F.C. as a vehicle of to deflect from the kingdom's poor human rights records. On 30 June 2020, the Premier League chief executive Richard Master, appearing in front of the culture and sport department select committee, was criticized by The SNP's John Nicolson for hinting a possible takeover of Newcastle United F.C. He argued that Premier League blocked Louis Tomlinson from taking over Doncaster Rovers for crimes against music, while it is  finding it difficult to block Prince Mohammed bin Salman who lured Jamal Khashoggi to enter Saudi embassy and later chopped him into small pieces.

On 6 July 2020, under the post-Brexit measures, UK imposed tough sanctions on 20 Saudi nationals involved in the murder of journalist Jamal Khashoggi. The new sanctions come into effect immediately, freezing the UK assets of those named by UK foreign secretary Dominic Raab and further banning them from entering the country.

In July 2020, a group of cross-party MPs launched a bid to bar the potential transfer of ownership of Newcastle United from Mike Ashley (businessman) to the Saudi Public Investment Fund, which is headed by Crown prince Mohammed bin Salman. The group vowed that the takeover is a potential opening for Saudi to whitewash its image and that the transfer should not go ahead “unless Saudi Arabia reform their criminal justice system and release all political detainees”.

UK's foreign secretary and Commonwealth general secretary, Dominic Raab and Patricia Scotland, respectively, were urged by the supporters of Princess Basmah bint Saud bin Abdulaziz al-Saud in two separate letters to intervene in the release of the princess and her daughter. Princess Basmah has been held captive by the kingdom of Saudi Arabia for more than two years in Jeddah, along with her daughter Souhoud Al-Sharif for critical views against the kingdom. In the letters, the supporters of Princess Basmah requested that she received urgent medical treatment for her heart condition.

In 2010, a Saudi Prince was jailed after he abused his workers. He thought that he could get away with it. He was later sent back to Saudi Arabia.

In 2012, a Saudi Princess, Sara Bin Talal Al Saud, applied for asylum in the UK. She claims that she faced a lot of abuse in Saudi Arabia.

Following the death of Britain's Queen Elizabeth II on 8 September 2022, the UK's invitation to Saudi Arabia's Crown Prince, Mohammed Bin Salman, to attend the funeral sparked a storm of protest from human rights campaigners. Fiancée of murdered Saudi journalist Jamal Khashoggi, Hatice Cengiz, stated that the invitation was a stain on the memory of the Queen, and called for the arrest of Saudi crown prince. Protests were also planned against the visit of Prince Mohammed, as well as against visits by King Hamad bin Isa Al Khalifa of Bahrain and leaders from the UAE.

See also
 Foreign relations of Saudi Arabia
 Foreign relations of the United Kingdom
 List of Ambassadors of the United Kingdom to Saudi Arabia
 Operation Granby

References

External links

British Empire and Hejaz - Treaty of Friendship and Good Understanding

 
Bilateral relations of the United Kingdom
United Kingdom